H22 may refer to:
 H22 engine, an automobile engine from Honda
 British NVC community H22, a type of heath community in the British National Vegetation Classification
 Highway H22 (Ukraine)
 , a Royal Navy D-class destroyer
 , a Royal Navy H-class submarine
 Horikawa H-22, a Japanese trainer glider